{{Infobox album|
| name       = Belighted
| type       = Studio album
| artist     = iamthemorning
| cover      = IamthemorningBelightedCover.jpg
| alt        =
| released   = 15 September 2014
| recorded   = Assault & Battery 2 studio, House of Composers, Alchemea College of Audio Engineering
| venue      =
| studio     =
| genre      = Progressive Rock, Chamber Pop
| length     = 55:29
| label      = Kscope
| producer   = iamthemorning
| prev_title = Miscellany| prev_year  = 2014
| next_title = From the House of Arts
| next_year  = 2015
}}Belighted'' is the second studio album by chamber progressive band iamthemorning, and their first album released through Kscope. The album was released on 15 September 2014 and features drummer Gavin Harrison from Porcupine Tree.

Track listing

Personnel
iamthemorning
Marjana Semkina – Vocals, backing vocals
Gleb Kolyadin, Piano, keyboards
Additional musicians
Gavin Harrison – Drums
Max Roudenko – Bass
Vlad Avy – Guitars
Mark Knight – Guitars
Andres Izmaylov – Harp

References 

2014 albums
Iamthemorning albums
Kscope albums